Nicolae Cristoloveanu (born 13 December 1950) is a Romanian biathlete. He competed in the 20 km individual event at the 1976 Winter Olympics.

References

1950 births
Living people
Romanian male biathletes
Olympic biathletes of Romania
Biathletes at the 1976 Winter Olympics
Sportspeople from Brașov